Tommy Möller (born 1958) is a Swedish professor of Political science at Stockholm University,
and a frequent conservative political commentator in the Swedish media.

Möller received his PhD from Uppsala University in 1986.
Tommy Möller has been recognized for his work on Swedish elections and political parties.

As political commentator 

Möller has acted as political commentator in most all of the Swedish media, including Dagens Nyheter, Svenska Dagbladet, Aftonbladet, Expressen, Dagens Eko
and Rapport.
On Election Night, 2006, Möller provided political commentary for the national radio broadcaster Sveriges Radio as the votes were tallied. Möller has also written op-eds for the daily newspaper Dagens Nyheter.
During the controversy after the 2004 tsunami, Thomas Möller supported king Carl XVI Gustafs with op-eds in Dagens Nyheter and Expressen.

Other 

At Almedalen Week 2009, Möller chaired a seminar on political lobbying in Sweden, and participated in another seminar where he discussed the role of politicians in a political system using preferential voting.

Publications (selection) 
This list is limited to books. A more complete list of publications is available at Möller's department homepage
 Borgerlig samverkan. Uppsala: Diskurs Förlag, 1986. (Dissertation, Uppsala University) 
 Partier och organisationer, Mats Bäck and Tommy Möller, 1st edition, Stockholm: Allmänna förlaget, 1990. . Several more editions (6th edition, Stockholm: Norstedts Juridik, 2003)
 Brukare och klienter i välfärdsstaten: Om missnöje och påverkan inom barn- och äldreomsorg. Stockholm: Publica, 1996. 
 Politikerförakt eller mogen misstro? Stockholm: Svenska kommunförbundet, 1998. 
 Premiär för personval. Forskningsrapporter utgivna av Rådet för utvärdering av 1998 års val. SOU 1999:92. (Editor, with Sören Holmberg). 
 Demokratins trotjänare. Lokalt partiarbete förr och nu. Demokratiutredningens forskarvolym X, SOU 1999:130. (With Gullan Gidlund). 
 Politikens meningslöshet. Om misstro, cynism och utanförskap. Malmö: Liber förlag, 2000. 
 Att lyckas med välfärdsreformer. Erfarenheter, strategier och förutsättningar. Stockholm: Reforminstitutet, 2001. 
 Uppsala stads historia. 11, Nittonhundratalets Uppsala. (With Hans Norman). Uppsala: Almqvist & Wiksell, 2002.  (inb)
 Mellan ljusblå och mörkblå: Gunnar Heckscher som högerledare. Stockholm: SNS, 2004.  (inb)
 Svensk politisk historia 1809–1975. (1st edition) Lund, Studentlitteratur, 2004.  (2nd ed., Lund : Studentlitteratur, 2005, .)
 Folkomröstningar. Stockholm: SNS förlag, 2005. 
 Svensk politisk historia: strid och samverkan under tvåhundra år, Lund: Studentlitteratur, 2007. 
 Politiskt ledarskap. Malmö: Liber, 2009.

References 

Living people
1958 births
Swedish political scientists
Academic staff of Stockholm University
Uppsala University alumni